Hillcrest is a residential locality in the local government area (LGA) of Burnie in the North-west and west LGA region of Tasmania. The 2016 census recorded a population of 1042 for the state suburb of Hillcrest.
It is a suburb of Burnie in north-west Tasmania.

The Sampson Street Reserve is 2.3ha of public open space.

There is a shopping complex which includes a cafe and takeaway.

Hillcrest includes part of the Terrylands estate, which was developed from around 1949 by the Agricultural Bank. The rest is located in Montello. Terrylands is sometimes used informally as a suburb, but is not officially gazetted.

History 
Hillcrest was gazetted as a locality in 1966.

Geography
Shorewell Creek forms most of the western boundary.

Road infrastructure
Route A2 (Bass Highway) passes to the north-east. From there, various streets provide access to the locality.

Sport 
The Burnie Aquatic Centre, with indoor and outdoor swimming pools, is located in Hillcrest. The Burnie Judo Club trains at the facilities owned by the Burnie PCYC.

References

Suburbs of Burnie, Tasmania